Jin Kun (born 4 October 1999) is a Chinese footballer who plays as a midfielder. She has been a member of the China women's national team.

International goals

References

1999 births
Living people
Chinese women's footballers
Women's association football midfielders
China women's international footballers